The Thulin NA was a prototype Swedish fighter plane built in the late 1910s.

Design and development
The Thulin NA was a two-seat biplane based on the Thulin N. Both the upper and lower wings were fitted with knuckles which were connected by a push rod. The fuselage was provided with an open cockpit where one was placed in a tandem location. The fuselage is made of a lattice construction of welded steel pipes . The wheel ground was fixed with a spur spring under the height knob.

The Type NA was the last aircraft built by AB Thulinverke. Although it first flew in April 1919, the poor market demand after WW1 meant that the Type NA did not enter production.

Specifications

See also

References

Biplanes
Single-engined tractor aircraft
1910s Swedish aircraft
Aircraft first flown in 1919